In Greek mythology, Sinis (Ancient Greek: Σίνης) was a bandit killed by Theseus on his way to Athens.

Family 
Pseudo-Apollodorus describes Sinis as the son of Polypemon and Sylea, daughter of Corinth; he has also been described as the son of Canethus and Henioche.

Mythology 
An Isthmian outlaw, Sinis would force travelers to help him bend pine trees to the ground and then unexpectedly let go, catapulting the victims through the air. Alternative sources say that he tied people to two pine trees that he bent down to the ground, then let the trees go, tearing his victims apart. This led to him being called Pityocamptes (Πιτυοκάμπτης = "pine-bender").

Sinis was the second bandit to be killed by Theseus as the hero was traveling from Troezen to Athens, in the very same way that he had previously killed his own victims. Theseus then slept with Sinis's daughter, Perigune, who later bore Theseus's son, Melanippus. Perigune later married Deioneus of Oechalia.

Notes

Children of Poseidon
Labours of Theseus